Çarıklar is a village in the Köprübaşı district of Manisa Province, Turkey.  The waterline of the Demirköprü Dam system is nearby.

External links 
 http://www.yerelnet.org.tr/koyler/koy.php?koyid=254287

Populated places in Manisa Province